WEEK-TV (channel 25) is a television station in Peoria, Illinois, United States, affiliated with NBC, ABC, and The CW Plus. The station is owned by Gray Television, and maintains studios and transmitter facilities on Springfield Road (along I-474) in East Peoria, a section of Groveland Township, Tazewell County.

WEEK-TV formerly operated and shared its facility with then-ABC affiliate (now TBD owned-and-operated station) WHOI (channel 19, owned by Sinclair Broadcast Group) through joint sales and shared services agreements (JSA/SSA) until those agreements were terminated on October 1, 2016. WEEK-TV then took over its ABC and CW+ affiliations permanently on its second and third digital subchannels.

History
WEEK-TV began transmitting on February 1, 1953, with an analog signal on UHF channel 43. It has always been an NBC affiliate. It was owned and operated by the Oklahoma City-based Oklahoma Publishing Company along with WEEK radio (1350 AM now WOAM) through its broadcasting subsidiary, West Central Broadcasting Company. Edward K. Gaylord was president, and the chairman of the board was United States Senator, former governor of Oklahoma and founder of the Kerr-McGee Corporation Robert S. Kerr. Wayne Lovely, the first chief engineer of WEEK-AM-TV, supervised the construction of the stations' technical facilities and equipment installation in 1953. He remained with the station until 1974.

On November 7, 1957, WEEQ-TV in La Salle launched as a full-time satellite of WEEK-TV with the aim of increasing its signal reach. The UHF channel 35 allocation was most recently used for Trinity Broadcasting Network (TBN) affiliate WWTO-TV, which later broadcast digitally on very high frequency (VHF) channel 10, retaining the virtual channel 35 via PSIP. In 1964, the station switched from channel 43 to channel 25, where it remained until its analog signal shut down on February 17, 2009.

The channel 43 allocation was later moved from Peoria to Bloomington and used by the second incarnation of WBLN starting in 1982 (now Fox affiliate WYZZ-TV). OPUBCO sold the radio station in 1960, but retained the television stations until 1966, when it sold them to Kansas City Southern Industries. This was around the same time that Kansas City Southern acquired KRCG in Jefferson City, Missouri. The new owner then shut down WEEQ-TV in the early-1970s.

In 1985, Kansas City Southern Industries sold both its stations to Price Communications. On October 31, 1988, WEEK-TV and fellow NBC outlet KBJR-TV of Superior, Wisconsin, became the two founding stations of the Granite Broadcasting Corporation. In 1997, WEEK-TV bought the broadcasting license for 98.5 in Eureka, giving it the call sign WEEK-FM and the nickname "Oldies 98.5". Granite Broadcasting divested itself of the radio station, now WPIA, in 1999. WEEK has broadcast exclusively in digital since February 17, 2009.

On March 2, 2009, WEEK-TV took over operations of rival WHOI, then owned by Barrington Broadcasting, through joint sales and shared services agreements. This resulted in WHOI closing its longtime studios on North Stewart Street in Creve Coeur and sharing WEEK-TV's East Peoria facility. As a result of the consolidation, all five of Peoria's full-powered commercial television stations are now operated by two entities. Granite-owned CBS affiliate WTVH in Syracuse, New York, (WHOI's original call letters) also saw its operations merge with Barrington-owned NBC affiliate WSTM-TV and low-powered CW affiliate WSTQ-LP the same day. WSTM, however, is the senior partner in the arrangement with WTVH.

Sale to Quincy
On February 11, 2014, Quincy-based Quincy Newspapers announced it would acquire WEEK-TV; KBJR-TV; WBNG-TV in Binghamton, New York; and Malara Broadcasting-owned WPTA in Fort Wayne, Indiana, from Granite Broadcasting. Quincy initially intended to provide continued services to WHOI, but Sinclair (having just completed its acquisition of Barrington Broadcasting in November 2013) gave notice that the JSA/SSA between WHOI and WEEK-TV, originally set to expire in March 2017, would be terminated within nine months of the completion of Quincy's purchase of WEEK-TV. On September 30, 2015, the FCC approved Quincy's purchase of WEEK, and the sale was completed on November 2, nearly two years after the agreement was announced.

Through a separate joint sales agreement, WEEK-TV also controlled the market's MyNetworkTV outlet WAOE through the end of 2014. The station, owned by Four Seasons Broadcasting, was then based out of the Springfield Road studios. For a time, the facility also hosted some internal operations (e.g. programming log maintenance) for WBQD-LP, another Four Seasons-owned MyNetworkTV outlet (now WQAD-DT3). The station was controlled through a local marketing agreement with the Quad Cities' ABC affiliate, WQAD-TV (then owned by Local TV; currently owned by Tegna Inc.), maintaining the majority of day-to-day operations in the big three affiliate's studios in Moline, Illinois.

Sale to Gray Television
On February 1, 2021, Gray Television announced that it had entered into an agreement to acquire most of Quincy Media's television properties for $925 million in a cash transaction. The acquisition was completed on August 2, 2021, bringing WEEK-TV under common ownership with several Gray Television stations in nearby midwestern markets, including ABC affiliates KCRG-TV in Cedar Rapids and WBAY-TV in Green Bay, dual Fox/NBC affiliate KYOU-TV in Ottumwa/Kirksville, CBS affiliates KFVS-TV in Cape Girardeau, WSAW-TV in Wausau, KEYC-TV in Mankato, and WIFR-LD in Rockford, and fellow NBC affiliates KWQC-TV in Davenport–Rock Island–Moline, WMTV in Madison, WEAU in Eau Claire–La Crosse, WNDU-TV in South Bend, WFIE in Evansville, KYTV in Springfield, Missouri, KMNF-LD in Mankato, and WOWT in Omaha.

Subchannel history

WEEK-DT2
WEEK-DT2 is the ABC-affiliated second digital subchannel of WEEK-TV, broadcasting in 720p high definition on channel 25.2.

History
WEEK-DT2 was launched on November 15, 2004, as an affiliate of NBC Weather Plus, a 24-hour weather channel that provides local forecasts for certain areas. In December 2008, after NBC Weather Plus shut down, it affiliated with The Local AccuWeather Channel, and continued to do so until it went silent in 2014, thus ending the subchannel's run as a 24/7 weather affiliate.

On July 26, 2016, Quincy Media announced that it had acquired WHOI's ABC and CW affiliations from Sinclair, and would consolidate them onto subchannels of WEEK beginning August 1, 2016. As an aspect of this deal, Quincy-owned WSJV in South Bend similarly relinquished its Fox affiliation to Sinclair-owned WSBT-TV. With that, WEEK-DT2 returned to the air as an ABC affiliate. The ABC and CW subchannels were simulcast on WHOI for 60 days following the consolidation. The JSA between WHOI and WEEK, which had been running since March 2009, was terminated on October 1, 2016, at which point WHOI moved its Comet TV affiliation from its 19.3 subchannel to its main 19.1 channel, thereby taking the 19.2 and 19.3 subchannels dark, and WEEK-DT2 became the sole ABC affiliate for the Peoria television market. Originally, WEEK-DT2 carried the "HOI ABC" branding. In October 2017, WEEK-DT2 lengthened its branding to "Heart of Illinois ABC".

WEEK-DT3
WEEK-DT3 is the CW-affiliated third digital subchannel of WEEK-TV, broadcasting in 720p high definition on channel 25.3. All programming on WEEK-DT3 is received through The CW's programming feed for smaller media markets, The CW Plus, which provides a set schedule of syndicated programming acquired by The CW for broadcast during time periods outside of the network's regular programming hours; however, Quincy Media handles local advertising and promotional services for the subchannel.

Programming
Syndicated programming currently broadcast (as of September 2020) on WEEK-TV includes Dr. Phil, Rachael Ray and Inside Edition.

Because of the 5 p.m. hour-long newscast, WEEK-DT2 has aired an alternate live feed of ABC World News Tonight at 6 p.m. Syndicated programs broadcast (as of September 2022) on WEEK-DT2 includes Sherri, Tamron Hall, Extra, 25 Words or Less, Entertainment Tonight and The Kelly Clarkson Show. WEEK-DT2 is also one of a few ABC affiliates to air paid programming on weekdays.

News operation

Main channel
On June 5, 2006, WEEK-TV established a news share agreement with WAOE. The arrangement resulted in this station debuting a weeknight-only prime-time newscast on the then-UPN affiliate. Known as Primetime News at Nine (later known as News 25 at Nine on My59), the show could be seen for thirty minutes and offered competition to another weeknight half-hour production airing at the same time on WYZZ (produced by CBS affiliate WMBD-TV). WYZZ once aired a weekend edition of its newscast but this was dropped at some point in time. WAOE also provided a simulcast of WEEK-TV's weekday morning show (except for the first thirty-minute portion at 4:30 a.m.). After the JSA expired at the end of 2014, all WEEK-TV newscasts were dropped from WAOE.

In March 2009, after becoming operated by WEEK-TV, WHOI shut down its separate news department and merged it with the NBC outlet. A new secondary set was built at the Springfield Road studios for use by WHOI to produce separate newscasts. That station let go of most of its production and newscast personnel but added four on-air personalities to WEEK-TV's news team—three of whom are still employed by WEEK-TV today. WHOI dropped its own weeknight newscasts at 5 and 6 p.m. for a new show seen at 5:30 p.m. so it would not directly compete with WEEK-TV's own programs in those time slots. Until 2016, WHOI continued to produce a separate weekday morning show (the two anchors for that program did not appear on WEEK-TV) and a weeknight newscast at 10 p.m..

For many years on weekends, WEEK-TV and WHOI simulcast local news but there could have been a delay or preemption on one station because of network obligations (most notably sports programming). At some point after combining operations, the two outlets became the first news department in the market to upgrade local newscast production to 16:9 enhanced definition widescreen. That would be the case for the next several years. Although not truly high definition, the shows matched the aspect ratio of HD television screens.

In March 2020, due to the COVID-19 pandemic, WEEK-TV expanded its 10 p.m. newscast from 35 minutes to one hour.

WEEK-DT2 (Heart of Illinois ABC)

From August 1 to September 30, 2016, WEEK-DT2 simulcast WHOI's newscasts as HOI 19 News.

When the JSA between WHOI and WEEK-TV was terminated on October 1, Quincy Media transferred the newscasts from WHOI to the new ABC subchannel. The newscasts were then rebranded as HOI News (the branding that WHOI formerly used for its newscasts). WEEK-TV's main channel had upgraded local news production to high definition two months earlier, but initially, HOI ABC's newscasts carried over the 16:9 enhanced definition widescreen format that had been used by WHOI's news production years after it combined operations with WEEK-TV.

In October 2017, the subchannel upgraded its newscasts to full HD. The newscasts were rebranded as Heart of Illinois ABC News along with a new secondary set, music, and graphics package.

It was announced in July 2022 that WEEK-DT2's news operation will be combined with WEEK-DT1, with the Heart of Illinois ABC name being retired and all personnel and newscasts from Heart of Illinois ABC being moved to 25 News, to prevent the two subchannels from competing against each other. Some newscasts will be simulcast on both subchannels.

Technical information

Subchannels
The station's digital signal is multiplexed:

References

External links

Gray Television
Television channels and stations established in 1953
1953 establishments in Illinois
EEK-TV
NBC network affiliates
ABC network affiliates
Ion Television affiliates